Caroline Green (born October 3, 2003) is an American ice dancer. With her skating partner, Michael Parsons, she is the 2022 Four Continents champion, a four-time medalist on the ISU Challenger Series, and a three-time U.S. national medalist.

With her brother and former skating partner Gordon Green, she placed in the top six at the 2018 World Junior Championships and won the 2019 U.S. national junior title.

Early life 
Caroline Green was born on October 3, 2003, in Washington, D.C. Her mother, Mary, is a forensic scientist and her father, Richard, is a periodontist. She is the younger sister of Gordon Green. She attended Julius West Middle School before enrolling at Richard Montgomery High School in Rockville, Maryland.

Career

Early years 
Green began learning to skate when she was five years old. She teamed up with her brother in August 2009 and joined the Wheaton Ice Skating Academy in September. The siblings took gold in the juvenile category at the 2013 U.S. Championships and won the intermediate title at the 2014 edition.

At the 2015 and 2016 U.S. Championships, the Greens took gold in the novice category. They then moved up to the junior level domestically and placed fifth at the 2017 U.S. Championships.

2017–18 season: International junior debut 
Having become age-eligible for junior international events, the Greens made their ISU Junior Grand Prix (JGP) debut, winning bronze in Riga, Latvia, and Gdańsk, Poland. They finished as third alternates for the JGP Final.

In January, they took silver at the 2018 U.S. Championships, scoring 12.46 points less than champions Christina Carreira / Anthony Ponomarenko, and were assigned to the 2018 World Junior Championships in Sofia. In Bulgaria, the siblings ranked fifth in the short dance, seventh in the free dance, and sixth overall.

2018–19 season: National junior championship 
The Greens withdrew from their JGP assignments due to Caroline's illness.  She subsequently commented that having been off the ice for two months and having to readjust to skating was a significant challenge, as neither sibling had had to deal with a major injury before. Returning to competition, they won junior gold medals at the 2018 Golden Spin of Zagreb in December and at the Toruń Cup in early January. At the 2019 U.S. Championships, they outscored Avonley Nguyen / Vadym Kolesnik by 1.48 points to become national junior champions.

The Greens concluded the season at the 2019 World Junior Championships.  Caroline stumbled during the tango pattern dance segment in the rhythm dance, leading to an eighth-place finish.  They improved in the free dance, moving up to seventh place.

Following the end of the competitive season, Gordon decided to retire from competitive ice dance to focus on academics, while Caroline opted to continue skating.  On June 20, it was announced that she teamed up with Michael Parsons, the 2017 World Junior champion.

2019–20 season: Debut of Green/Parsons 
Moving to the senior level, Green/Parsons placed fifth at Lake Placid Ice Dance International and the 2019 CS Lombardia Trophy.  Making their senior Grand Prix debut as a team, they placed seventh at 2019 Skate America.  Green remarked that the transition to the senior level had "definitely been mainly adapting to longer programs and more demanding elements. I think that it is a challenge that I am ready for."  Competing the following week at the 2019 Skate Canada International, Green/Parsons again placed seventh. They won their first international medal, a bronze, at the 2019 CS Warsaw Cup behind Lauriault/Le Gac of France and Russia's Konkina/Drozd.

Competing at their first U.S. Championships, Green/Parsons placed fifth in the rhythm dance.  They were fifth in the free dance, despite a fall.  Parsons said afterward that they were "still a very young team, but it's coming along faster than I ever expected. I couldn't be more proud; I am very happy."

2020–21 season 
The coronavirus pandemic and resultant lockdowns resulted in Green and Parsons not being able to see or train with each other from March to June. Caroline enlisted her brother Gordon as a training partner at home.  In order to limit international travel, the ISU assigned the Grand Prix based on geographic location, and Green/Parsons attended the 2020 Skate America.  They finished in fourth place.

Green/Parsons went on to finish fourth at the 2021 U.S. Championships, taking the pewter medal.

2021–22 season: Four Continents gold 
For their free dance, Green, Parsons, and their choreographers opted to design a program in emulation of Martha Graham's style of modern dance, which Parsons characterized as involving "a lot of emotion into almost sparse movements."

Green/Parsons made their Olympic season debut at the 2021 CS Autumn Classic International, winning the bronze medal. Competing next on the Grand Prix at the 2021 Skate Canada International, they finished in fourth place. They were initially assigned to the 2021 Cup of China as their second Grand Prix, but following its cancellation, they were reassigned to the 2021 Gran Premio d'Italia. They placed fourth in the rhythm dance but dropped to fifth place after Green fell exiting a lift in the free dance.

Entering the 2022 U.S. Championships seeking to qualify for the third berth on the American Olympic team, Green/Parsons placed third in the rhythm dance despite a twizzle error, slightly ahead of defending national bronze medalists Hawayek/Baker, who also had a twizzle error. They were fourth in the free dance and dropped behind Hawayek/Baker overall, taking the pewter medal. They were named first alternates for the Olympic team and were sent to compete at the 2022 Four Continents Championships in Tallinn, where they won the gold medal. Parsons reflected on not making the Olympic team, saying, "even while not making the team, we set ourselves up very well for the next four years, and this is a great starting point right here. Not making the team is certainly a motivation."

2022–23 season 
Green and Parsons left their longtime coaches at Wheaton Ice Dance Academy to train at the new Michigan Ice Dance Academy founded by retired Olympic medalists Charlie White and Tanith Belbin. Of the change, Parsons said, "these next four years are about pushing ourselves as skaters, as artists, and as people."

Beginning the season at the 2022 CS Finlandia Trophy, Green/Parsons placed fifth. In their first Grand Prix at the 2022 Skate Canada International, the team placed narrowly third in the rhythm dance but were overtaken in the free dance by Canadians Lajoie/Lagha and finished in fourth place, albeit significantly improving their scores over the Finlandia Trophy. At their second Grand Prix, the 2022 NHK Trophy in Sapporo, they won the bronze medal, their first Grand Prix medal as a partnership and Green's first.

With presumptive national silver medalists Hawayek/Baker missing the 2023 U.S. Championships for health reasons, Green/Parsons entered the event as the favourites for the silver, and finished almost ten points clear of bronze medalists Carreira/Ponomarenko.

Green/Parsons entered the 2023 Four Continents Championships as contenders for the bronze medal, but after Parsons fell in the rhythm dance they placed fifth in that segment, 9.05 points back of Lajoie/Lagha in third. They placed fourth in the free dance, but remained in fifth overall, and finishing behind Carreira/Ponomarenko, who came fourth. Parsons said that they were happy with their performance on the day.

Programs

With Parsons

With Green

Competitive highlights 
GP: Grand Prix; CS: Challenger Series; JGP: Junior Grand Prix. Pewter medals (4th place) awarded only at U.S. national, sectional, and regional events.

With Parsons

With Green

References

External links 
 
 

2003 births
American female ice dancers
Living people
Figure skaters from Washington, D.C.
21st-century American women
Four Continents Figure Skating Championships medalists